Cantinoa is a genus of flowering plants in the family Lamiaceae.  It is native primarily to New World, with some species introduced in the old world. 

The endemic range of this genus is Tropical and Subtropical America. It is found in Argentina, Belize, Bolivia, Brazil, Colombia, Costa Rica, Cuba, Dominican Republic, Ecuador, El Salvador, Florida, French Guiana, Galápagos, Guatemala, Guyana, Haiti, Honduras, Jamaica, the Leeward Islands, Mexico, Nicaragua, Panamá, Paraguay, Peru, Puerto Rico, Suriname, Trinidad, Tobago, Uruguay, Venezuela and the Windward Islands.

It was first described and published by Raymond Mervyn Harley and José Floriano Barêa Pastore in Phytotaxa vol.58 on page 8 in 2012.

The genus name of Cantinoa is in honour of Philip D. Cantino (or Philip Douglas Cantino) (b. 1948), who is an American botanist at Ohio University. He specialised in Lamiaceae plants. 	

The genus is not recognized by the United States Department of Agriculture and the Agricultural Research Service, they class it as a possible synonym of Hyptis

Species
As accepted by Kew;

 Cantinoa althaifolia (Pohl ex Benth.) Harley & J.F.B.Pastore
 Cantinoa americana (Aubl.) Harley & J.F.B.Pastore
 Cantinoa carpinifolia (Benth.) Harley & J.F.B.Pastore
 Cantinoa colombiana (Epling) Harley & J.F.B.Pastore
 Cantinoa dubia (Pohl ex Benth.) Harley & J.F.B.Pastore
 Cantinoa duplicatodentata (Pohl ex Benth.) Harley & J.F.B.Pastore
 Cantinoa erythrostachys (Epling) Harley & J.F.B.Pastore
 Cantinoa heterodon (Epling) Harley & J.F.B.Pastore
 Cantinoa impar (Epling) Harley & J.F.B.Pastore
 Cantinoa indivisa (Pilg.) Harley & J.F.B.Pastore
 Cantinoa macroptera (Briq.) Harley & J.F.B.Pastore
 Cantinoa multiseta (Benth.) Harley & J.F.B.Pastore
 Cantinoa muricata (Schott ex Benth.) Harley & J.F.B.Pastore
 Cantinoa mutabilis (Rich.) Harley & J.F.B.Pastore
 Cantinoa nanuzae Harley
 Cantinoa x obvallata (Benth.) Harley & J.F.B.Pastore
 Cantinoa pinetorum (Epling) Harley & J.F.B.Pastore
 Cantinoa plectranthoides (Benth.) Harley & J.F.B.Pastore
 Cantinoa propinqua (Epling) Harley & J.F.B.Pastore
 Cantinoa racemulosa (Mart. ex Benth.) Harley & J.F.B.Pastore
 Cantinoa rubicunda (Pohl ex Benth.) Harley & J.F.B.Pastore
 Cantinoa similis (Epling) Harley & J.F.B.Pastore
 Cantinoa stricta (Benth.) Harley & J.F.B.Pastore
 Cantinoa subrotunda (Pohl ex Benth.) Harley & J.F.B.Pastore
 Cantinoa x sylvularum (A.St.-Hil. ex Benth.) Harley & J.F.B.Pastore
 Cantinoa villicaulis (Epling) Harley & J.F.B.Pastore
 Cantinoa violacea (Pohl ex Benth.) Harley & J.F.B.Pastore

References

Lamiaceae
Lamiaceae genera
Flora of Florida
Flora of Mexico
Flora of Central America
Flora of the Caribbean
Flora of northern South America
Flora of western South America
Flora of Brazil